Session Road is a six-lane  major road in Baguio, Philippines. The entire road forms part of National Route 231 (N231) of the Philippine highway network.

Route description
Session Road is the main thoroughfare of Baguio in the Philippines and is the main hub of what is called the Baguio Central Business District.

Lower Session Road
The Lower Session Road extends eastward from Magsaysay Avenue (opposite the Plaza or kilometer zero and Malcolm Square) running through the BCBD until the intersections of Father Carlu Street (towards the Baguio Cathedral and Upper Bonifacio Street) and Governor Pack Road.  This is the area where businesses are located, among others banks, shops, restaurants, bakeries, hotels, newsstands, boutiques, and studios.

Upper Session Road
The Upper Session Road extends from Post Office Loop, Leonard Wood Road, and the foot of Luneta Hill (where SM City Baguio is located) to the rotunda cutting toward South Drive (towards Baguio Country Club), Loakan Road (towards Camp John Hay, Loakan Airport, Philippine Military Academy, Baguio City Economic Zone, and the mine areas of Itogon, Benguet), and Military Cut-Off (towards Kennon Road).

History
Session Road derives its name from the fact that it used to lead up to the old Baden-Powell Hall, where the Philippine Commission held its sessions from April 22 to June 11, 1904, and officially initiated the use of Baguio as the Philippine Summer Capital. The Commission was composed of Governor General Luke E. Wright, president, and Commissioners Henry Ide, Dean Conant Worcester, Trinidad Pardo de Tavera, Benito Legarda, Jose de Luzuriaga, James Francis Smith and William Cameron Forbes. A marker by what is now Baden-Powell Inn, right beside the enormous bus terminals on Governor Pack Road, stand as the only visible evidence that anything of historical significance ever took place on Session Road.

Session Road used to host Japanese bazaars in the 1920s and 1930s. During World War II, the road was almost obliterated when the Americans bombed Baguio to liberate it from the Japanese.

The road was also part of Highway 11 or Route 11 that served the Cordillera Range.

Intersections

In popular culture
A local Philippine band called sessiOnroad based their name on the famous thoroughfare.

References

External links 

Baguio
Roads in Benguet
Shopping districts and streets in the Philippines